WJMK (short for Wuju Meki) was a four-member special project unit group between Cosmic Girls and Weki Meki created by Starship Entertainment and Fantagio Music. It is composed of four members: Seola, Luda, Yoojung and Doyeon.

History

2018: Debut with "Strong"
On May 2, 2018, Starship Entertainment and Fantagio Music announced the special formation of the project unit and released teaser images online. Promotional images were released throughout the month with bright color concepts. On June 1, their digital single "Strong" was released along with its music video.

Members
 Seola
 Luda
 Choi Yoo-jung
 Kim Do-yeon

Discography

Singles

Filmography

Music videos

References

External links

K-pop music groups
Musical groups established in 2018
South Korean girl groups
South Korean pop music groups
South Korean dance music groups
Musical groups from Seoul
2018 establishments in South Korea
Cosmic Girls
Starship Entertainment artists